Gorenja Vas pod Režišami is a former village in western Slovenia in the Municipality of Logatec. It is now part of the town of Logatec. It is part of the traditional region of Inner Carniola and is now included in the Central Slovenia Statistical Region.

Geography
Gorenja Vas pod Režišami is located in the southwestern part of the Logatec Karst Field along the main road from Vrhnika to Kalce. Black Creek flows through the village, after which it soon joins Reka Creek to form the Logaščica River. The village includes the hamlets of Grad, Klanec, and Podstrmca. The soil is gravelly, and the terrain is swampy along the upper reaches of the creek. Režiše Hill rises southwest of the village.

Name
The name Gorenja vas means 'upper village' and refers to its elevated location compared to the surrounding terrain. The name of the village was changed from Gorenja vas to Gorenja vas pod Režišami ('below Režiše Hill') in 1953.

History
Gorenja Vas had a population of 310 (in 46 houses) in 1880, 259 (in 48 houses) in 1900, and 282 (in 51 houses) in 1931. Gorenja Vas pod Režišami was annexed by Logatec in 1972, ending its existence as a separate settlement.

Notable people
Notable people that were born or lived in Gorenja Vas pod Režišami include:
 (1906–1997), gynecologist and obstetrician

References

External links

Gorenja Vas pod Režišami on Geopedia

Populated places in the Municipality of Logatec
Former settlements in Slovenia